Kofi Okyere-Agyekum (born March 8, 1958) is a Ghanaian politician and member of the Seventh Parliament of the Fourth Republic of Ghana representing the Fanteakwa South Constituency in the Eastern Region on the ticket of the New Patriotic Party.

Early life and education 
Okyere-Agyekum was born on March 8, 1958. He hails from Osino, a town in the Eastern Region of Ghana. He entered the University of Ghana and obtained his Bachelor of Science degree in agricultural economics in 1981. He also attended Ghana Institute of Management and Public Administration and obtained a Master's of Business Administration degree in finance in 2007.

Politics 
Okyere-Agyekum is a member of the New Patriotic Party (NPP). In 2012, he contested for the Fanteakwa South seat on the ticket of the NPP sixth parliament of the fourth republic and won.

Employment 
 Corporate manager, Uniliver, 1984–2000
 Supply chain manager, Cleansing Solution Limited, Tema
 Member of Parliament (January 7, 2013–present; 2nd term)

Personal life 
Okyere-Agyekum is a Christian (Presbyterian). He is married (with three children).

References 

Ghanaian MPs 2017–2021
Living people
1958 births
New Patriotic Party politicians
Ghanaian MPs 2021–2025